Briana D. Sewell (born 1990) is an American politician serving as a member of the Virginia House of Delegates from the 51st district since 2022. A member of the Democratic Party, she was elected in 2021 to succeed retiring Democrat Hala Ayala. Sewell represents parts of Prince William County, including the towns of Lake Ridge and Nokesville.

Early life and education 
Sewell was born in 1990 in Woodbridge, Virginia. Both of her parents were members of the United States Air Force; at retirement, her father held the rank of senior master sergeant, while her mother attained the rank of lieutenant colonel. Her family was stationed in Panama for three years before moving to Lake Ridge, Virginia.

Sewell earned a Bachelor of Arts in public policy from the College of William & Mary. She later attended American University, where she earned a Master of Public Administration.

Political career 
Sewell began her career in politics as district director for U.S. Representative Gerry Connolly. In 2018, she established the Virginia Campaign for a Family Friendly Economy, an organization that advocates for paid parental leave, paid sick leaves, and affordable healthcare. Before becoming a legislator, she served as chief of staff to Ann Wheeler, the chair of the Prince William Board of County Supervisors.

Virginia House of Delegates 
Sewell announced her candidacy for the 51st district in December 2020, shortly after incumbent Hala Ayala announced her retirement to run for Lieutenant Governor of Virginia. She received multiple endorsements, including from U.S. Senators Tim Kaine and Mark Warner, Congressman Gerry Connolly, and various state legislators, including Ayala herself. Sewell defeated her opponent, Republican U.S. Navy veteran Tim Cox, in the November 2021 general election by a margin of around 6.9 percentage points. She took office, along with the rest of the 162nd Virginia General Assembly, on January 12, 2022.

Personal life 
She is the cousin of Terri Sewell, a U.S. Representative from Alabama.

References

External links 
 Campaign website

1990 births
20th-century African-American women
20th-century African-American people
21st-century African-American women
21st-century American politicians
21st-century American women politicians
21st-century Baptists
African-American state legislators in Virginia
African-American women in politics
Alpha Kappa Alpha members
American University alumni
Baptists from Virginia
College of William & Mary alumni
Living people
Democratic Party members of the Virginia House of Delegates
People from Prince William County, Virginia
Women state legislators in Virginia